Aristotelia eupatoriella is a moth of the family Gelechiidae. It was described by August Busck in 1934. It is found in Cuba.

The larvae feed on Eupatorium species, including Eupatorium villosum.

References

Moths described in 1934
Aristotelia (moth)
Moths of the Caribbean
Endemic fauna of Cuba